Zdravka Evtimova (Bulgarian: Здравка Евтимова) (born 24 July 1959 in Pernik, Bulgaria) is a contemporary Bulgarian writer. She has four short story collections and four novels published in Bulgarian. Her short stories have appeared in many international literary journals. Some of her short story collections were translated into other languages. As well as being an author, Zdravka works as a literary translator from English, French and German.

Zdravka Evtimova has translated more than 25 novels by English, American and Canadian authors into Bulgarian language. She translates the work of Bulgarian writers into English and is a member of the Bulgarian Writers' Union and the Writers' League in UK, Yorkshire-Humberside region. She is a member of the Bulgarian PEN-Club.

Books 
Short Story Collections and novels by Zdravka Evtimova published outside Bulgaria (published abroad) :
 Blood, 2003
 Bitter Sky, Skrev Press, UK, 2003;
 Somebody Else, MAG Press, USA, 2004;
 God of Traitors, Books for a Buck Press, USA, 2006;
  Miss Daniella,Skrev Press, UK, 2007;
 Good Figure, Beautiful Voice, Astemari Publishers, USA, 2008;
 Pale and Other Bulgarian Stories, Vox Humana Publishes, Israel/Canada, 2010.
    Carts and Other Stories, Fomite Publishing, USA, 2012
    Time to Mow and Other Stories, All Things That matter Press, USA, 2012
    Impossibly Blue, Skrev Press, UK, 2013
    Endless July, paraxenes meres, Greece, 2013
      Wrong and Other stories, short story collection, TIKTAKTI Press, 2014, Israel.
    SINFONIA BULGARICA novel, (the Bulgarian title of the novel is Thursday), Fomite Books, USA,2014. 
   Sinfonia, novel,(the Bulgarian title of the novel is Thursday), Besa Editrice, Italy. 2015
    Thursday, novel, Arts and Literature publishing, China, 2016
    Thursday, novel ( the title in Macedonia is "ЧЕТВРТОК"), Antolog Publishing,. Macedonia, 2016
    Thursday, novel, Vaslaar Books, 2016, Serbia
    In the Town of Joy and Peace, novel,  Fomite Books, 2017 The Bulgarian title of the book is THE ARCH)"
    Parable of Stones and Other Stories, short story collection, All Things That matter Press, USA, 2017
    Lo Stesso Fiume , novel (The English title is THE SAME RIVER) Besa Editrice, Italy 2017

References

External links 
 Zdravka Evtimova's Profile on the Contemporary Bulgarian Writers Website
 Zdravka Evtimova at Literaturen Club
 

Living people
1959 births
Bulgarian writers
People from Pernik
Bulgarian women writers